Hampton Lansden Fancher (born July 18, 1938) is an American actor, screenwriter, and filmmaker, best known for co-writing the 1982 neo-noir science fiction film Blade Runner and its 2017 sequel Blade Runner 2049, based on the novel Do Androids Dream of Electric Sheep? by Philip K. Dick. His 1999 directorial debut, The Minus Man, won the Special Grand Prize of the Jury at the Montreal World Film Festival.

He lives in the Brooklyn Heights district of New York City.

Early life
Fancher was born to a Mexican-Danish mother and an English-American father, a physician, in East Los Angeles, California. At 15, he ran away to Spain to become a flamenco dancer and renamed himself "Mario Montejo". Following the breakup of his marriage to Joann McNabb, he was married to Sue Lyon from 1963 to 1965.

Career
In 1959, Fancher appeared in the episode "Misfits" of the ABC western television series The Rebel.

Fancher played Deputy Lon Gillis in seven episodes of the ABC western Black Saddle with Peter Breck. He guest-starred on other westerns: Have Gun, Will Travel, Tate, Stagecoach West, Outlaws, Maverick (in the fourth-season episode "Last Stop: Oblivion"), Lawman, Temple Houston, Cheyenne (1961 episode "Incident at Dawson Flats"), and also Bonanza (1966 episode "A Dollar's Worth of Trouble"). In 1967, Fancher guest-starred on Mannix in the episode “Turn Every Stone.”

Fancher appeared in two Troy Donahue films, 1961's Parrish and 1962's Rome Adventure, and was cast as Larry Wilson in the 1963 episode "Little Richard" of the CBS anthology series GE True, hosted by Jack Webb. In 1965, he played the role of Hamp Fisher in the Perry Mason episode "The Case of the Silent Six." Fancher acted in more than 50 movies and television shows. During this time, he also had relationships with a variety of women, including Barbara Hershey and Teri Garr. Although he showed interest in screenwriting, it took until 1977 for Fancher to transition fully into it. He continues to act occasionally.

After trying to option Philip K. Dick's 1968 science fiction novel Do Androids Dream of Electric Sheep? in 1975, when the rights were not available, Fancher sent his friend Brian Kelly, a prospective film producer, to negotiate with Dick. Dick agreed, and Fancher was brought on to write a screenplay before Kelly would later enlist the support of producer Michael Deeley. This made Fancher the executive producer, which led to disagreements with eventual director Ridley Scott, who then brought in David Peoples to continue reworking the script. Scott and Fancher had already clashed concerning the movie, as Scott felt the original script did not sufficiently explore the world of the movie, choosing instead to focus on the interior drama. Fancher's rewriting process was too slow for the production crew, which nicknamed him "Happen Faster". The movie was ultimately filmed and released as Blade Runner (1982).

Fancher wrote two films following Blade Runner. The Mighty Quinn (1989) starred Denzel Washington and The Minus Man (1999) starred Owen Wilson. Fancher also directed the latter. More recently, he wrote the story and co-wrote, with Michael Green, the screenplay for Blade Runner 2049 (2017), a sequel to the 1982 film.

In the early 1980s, Fancher lived outside of Los Angeles in Topanga Canyon. Fancher appeared in a cameo role in the independent film Tonight at Noon (2009), directed by Michael Almereyda and starring Rutger Hauer.

In 2019, Fancher published The Wall Will Tell You, a screenwriting manual. The book draws from his personal experiences.

Later work
Fancher provided voiceover commentary for The Criterion Collection edition DVD extras of the film noir adaptations of Ernest Hemingway's short story "The Killers", which included the 1946, 1956 and 1964 versions.

His life was the subject of Escapes, a documentary directed by Michael Almereyda and executive-produced by Wes Anderson.

Filmography

Film

Television

References

External links 

Salon.com – The flamenco man: Hampton Fancher

American male film actors
American male television actors
American film directors of Mexican descent
Film producers from California
American male screenwriters
Hugo Award-winning writers
Living people
Male actors from Los Angeles
Film directors from California
Western (genre) television actors
Screenwriters from California
Screenwriting instructors
Writers of books about writing fiction
American people of Danish descent
American male actors of Mexican descent
1938 births